
Year 191 BC was a year of the pre-Julian Roman calendar. At the time it was known as the Year of the Consulship of Nasica and Glabrio (or, less frequently, year 563 Ab urbe condita). The denomination 191 BC for this year has been used since the early medieval period, when the Anno Domini calendar era became the prevalent method in Europe for naming years.

Events 
 By place 
 Roman Republic 
 The Romans under Manius Acilius Glabrio and Cato the Elder cut the Seleucid king Antiochus III off from his reinforcements in Thrace and outflank his position at the pass of Thermopylae in the Battle of Thermopylae. With the remainder of his troops, Antiochus flees to Chalcis on Euboea and from there he retreats by sea to Ephesus.
 Manius Acilius Glabrio then turns his attention to the Aetolian League, which has persuaded Antiochus to declare war against Rome, and is only prevented from crushing them by the intercession of Titus Quinctius Flamininus.
 Scipio Africanus persuades the Roman Senate to continue the war against Antiochus III by making him the chief commander and allowing him and his brother, Lucius Cornelius Scipio Asiaticus, to follow Antiochus into Anatolia.
 The Roman calendar, which is four months ahead of the seasons, is adjusted (by Lex Acilia de intercalando).
 Cisalpine Gaul becomes a Roman province.

 Carthage 
 The Carthaginians manage to collect the indemnity due to Rome (through the peace treaty signed between them ten years earlier) but not payable in full for 50 years. The Romans, in order to keep their hold on Carthage, refuse to accept the early payment of the indemnity.

 Parthia 
 Arsaces II, king of Parthia, is considered to have been murdered on the orders of Antiochus III. Arsaces is succeeded by his cousin Phriapatius.

 China 
 Emperor Hui of Han lifts the ban on Confucian writings ordered in 213 BC.

Deaths 
 Arsaces II, King of Parthia, who had reigned from about 211 BC (murdered)

References